Bukit Rahman Putra is a township in Sungai Buloh, Selangor, Malaysia. This townships was established in 1991 by Land & General Sdn Bhd and was named after the first Malaysian prime minister, Tunku Abdul Rahman Putra Al-Haj.

Townships in Selangor